The Ellis Island Casino & Brewery is located near the Las Vegas Strip in Paradise, Nevada. The casino offers 350 gaming devices, as well as restaurants, a Karaoke bar and a brewery.

History
The Village Pub was opened in 1967 by Frank Ellis, who eventually passed it on to his son, Gary.

The name was changed to Ellis Island in 1985. On September 19, 1997, Ellis Island opened a large portion of a $12 million renovation and expansion, which doubled its slot machine count to 410 and introduced table games by adding six blackjack tables.

In 1995 Ellis relaunched the Village Pub brand. As of 2020, the family owns and operates 12 Village Pub restaurants in the Las Vegas area.

Ellis agreed in 2004 to manage and take joint ownership of the nearby Tuscany Suites and Casino, which had struggled to attract customers in its first year. The agreement fell apart when Tuscany officials allegedly backed out.

Later that year, Ellis signed on to the planned 46-story Aqua Blue condo-hotel project to replace an adjacent Super 8 motel. Ellis Island would manage the Aqua Blue casino, and would itself be renovated to match the new tower. However, the project was cancelled in June 2005, due in part to rising construction costs.

In 2014 Ellis bought the adjacent Super 8 motel, creating a vertically integrated hotel and casino business. In 2018, the hotel's rooms and facilities were renovated.

Planning for an expansion project began in 2017, with construction work commencing later that year. After some delays, in December 2019 Ellis Island opened the "Front Yard" with a new restaurant, bar and beer garden.

Brewery 
In 1993, Ellis established a brewery on the premise and tasked brewmaster Joe Pickett with brewing a variety of beers for the casino's restaurants. Regular brews include Lager, Light Lager, Amber Ale, India Pale Ale, Hefeweizen, Stout and Root Beer, as well as seasonal specials.

With 3345 barrels produced in 2009, Ellis Island Brewery was the largest brewpub in the Mountain West region (Arizona, Colorado, Idaho, Montana, Nevada, New Mexico, Utah and Wyoming).

In 2018, the brewhouse capacity was doubled and two new brewmasters, Eddie Leal and Michael Key, were hired to run the brewing business.

In December 2018, Ellis established Silver Reef Brewing Company in St. George, Utah, adding annual capacity of up to 10,000 barrels to the brewing business. 

In 2022, the on-site brewery at the Las Vegas casino was dismantled. Beer production continues at Silver Reef Brewing.

See also
 Beer in the United States

References

External links 
Ellis Island Casino & Brewery

Casinos in the Las Vegas Valley
Beer brewing companies based in Nevada
Buildings and structures in Paradise, Nevada